The Ministry of Foreign Affairs and International Cooperation of the Republic of Somaliland  is the Somaliland government ministry which oversees the foreign relations of Somaliland. The present minister is Dr Essa Keyd.

List Ministers of Foreign Affairs 

 Yuusuf Sheekh Cali Madar
 Osman Abdilahi Jama
 Mohamed Abdi Dhinbil “Galbeedi”
 Saleban Mohamoud Adan
 Mohamoud Saed Fagadhe
 Abdihakim Garad Jama
 Mohamed Saed Gees
 2003-2006 Edna Adan Ismail
 2006-2010 Abdilahi Mohamed Dualeh
 2010-2013 Mohammad Abdullahi Omar
 2013-2015 Mahamed Biihi Yonis
 2015-2018 Dr. Saad Ali Shire
 2018-2021 Yasin Haji Mohamoud “Faratoon”
 2021 Liban Yusuf Osman (Acting Foreign Minister)
 2021 - present ( Dr. Essa Kayd Mahamud )

See also

Diplomatic missions of Somaliland
Foreign relations of Somaliland
List of diplomatic missions in Somaliland

References

External links
 Ministry of Foreign Affairs of the Republic of Somaliland

Foreign Affairs, Ministry of
Somaliland
Politics of Somaliland
Government ministries of Somaliland